José Antonio Saro Palleiro (born 10 January 1938) is a Spanish retired footballer who played as a winger, and a current coach.

Playing career
Born in Santander, Cantabria, Saro joined Racing de Santander in 1954, aged 16, but only appeared as a senior with the reserves. In 1959, after suffering a serious knee injury and being released, he joined Gimnástica de Torrelavega.

In the 1960 summer Saro moved to Segunda División with Celta de Vigo. He made his professional debut on 25 September, starting in a 2–0 away win against UD Salamanca.

Saro subsequently suffered another injury while at Celta, and after appearing sparingly signed for Salamanca also in the second level. In 1965 he joined fellow league team Real Murcia, retiring with the latter in 1966.

Post-playing career
Immediately after retiring Saro was appointed manager of CD Cayón. After spells at Rayo Cantabria, SD Textil Escudo, CD Laredo, Santoña CF and CD Naval, he was named Racing de Ferrol manager in 1980.

Saro left the Galicians in 1984, and was appointed at the helm of SD Ponferradina three years later. In October 1989, shortly after being sacked by the latter, he took charge of CD Numancia, leaving the club in the following year.

Saro was also in charge of Gimnástica de Torrelavega for the 1996–97 campaign, before returning to Ponfe in 1999. He was sacked by the latter on 5 March 2001.

References

External links

Yo Jugué en Celta profile 

1938 births
Living people
Spanish footballers
Footballers from Santander, Spain
Association football wingers
Segunda División players
Tercera División players
Racing de Santander players
RC Celta de Vigo players
UD Salamanca players
Real Murcia players
Spanish football managers
Racing de Ferrol managers
SD Ponferradina managers
CD Numancia managers
Gimnástica de Torrelavega managers
Rayo Cantabria players